The World Bowling Writers (WBW) International Bowling Hall of Fame was established in 1993 and is located in the International Bowling Museum and Hall of Fame, on the International Bowling Campus in Arlington, Texas.

History
The International Bowling Museum and Hall of Fame was located at 11 Stadium Plaza, St. Louis, Missouri, USA, and shared the same building with the St. Louis Cardinals Hall of Fame Museum, until November 8, 2008.  It moved to Arlington and reopened in early 2010. In 2012, the WBW was merged with the International Bowling Media Association. After the merger, the WBW Hall of Fame inductees became part of the IBMA Luby Hall of Fame.

Criteria for election
WBW Hall of Famers are chosen strictly in the basis of athletic performance, to even qualify for consideration, a player must be an amateur and accumulate a minimum of 15 points in any combination of four specifically designated international competitions;
the Fédération Internationale des Quilleurs (FIQ) adult World Championships
 the Bowling World Cup
 the Fédération Internationale des Quilleurs (FIQ) adult Zone Masters Championships
 and the Olympic Games

with gold medals occurring in an event other than five-person team. Five points are credited for a gold medal, three points for silver, and one for bronze.

Each summer, the WBW Administrator scans a database to determine eligible candidates and sends ballots with those players’ names and resumes to current officers of the World Bowling Writers, which formed the Hall’s Board.

Election process
There are two categories: “Men” and “Women.” Voters can cast one vote in each category for every three names listed there, and one vote for any group of “leftovers” names in each category that totals less than three. The man and woman who receive the most votes are elected.

In the case of ties, more than one man or one woman can be elected, provided that each candidate in the tie receives at least two-thirds of the total votes cast in that category that year. If that standard is not met, no one is elected in that category that year.

(WBW) International Bowling Hall of Fame members
See footnote

 2013 Inductees

See also
United States Bowling Congress Hall of Fame

References

External links
 
 International Bowling Media Association (IBMA) is a 2012 merger between World Bowling Writers and Bowling Writers Association of America.

Ten-pin bowling
Bowl
Bowl
Sports in Arlington, Texas
Awards established in 1993
Bowling organizations